Subterano is a 2003 Australian science fiction horror film directed by Esben Storm and starring Alex Dimitriades and Tasma Walton.

Plot
People trapped in an underground car park are attacked by robots.

Cast
Alex Dimitriades as Conrad
Tasma Walton as Stone
Alison Whyte as JD
Chris Haywood as Cleary
John Clayton as Bruce
Anne Tenney as Elaine
Shane Briant as Cunningham
Alyssa-Jane Cook as Mary
Morgan O'Neill as Chauffeur

Production
Esben Storm says he was inspired by the "automatic" weapons of war in Operation Desert Storm.
It's about God in a way. It's based on the lines from King Lear: `As flies to wanton boys are we to the gods. They kill us for their sport'. One of the themes is: if there is a God, what if that God is a prick; what if that God is just a bastard? For one of the characters, when he thinks that, it all makes sense, it makes sense of the world, that the world is such a slimy world of greed and selfishness and anguish and pain that the only way that it can make any sense is if the person who created the whole thing is... it's all a macabre joke. It's almost the opposite of Genesis 1: `We were made in God's image and likeness'. If you say, `We are sinful, horrible, we're in God's likeness, therefore that's what God is like'.

References

External links

Subterano at Screen Australia

Australian science fiction horror films
Films directed by Esben Storm
2000s English-language films
2000s Australian films